Rowland Constantine O'Malley Armstrong (born 8 May 1966), known professionally as Rollo, is an English music producer. He is one half of the remix/production duo Rollo & Sister Bliss and is a founding member of the electronic music group Faithless. He has remixed tracks for Pet Shop Boys, Simply Red, R. Kelly, U2, Moby, Grace, Tricky and Suede.

Early life 
Rollo was born to an Irish publisher and a French-English poet. His younger sister is singer Dido. He helped write and produce her multi-million selling albums No Angel, Life for Rent, Safe Trip Home and Still on My Mind. He studied at the University of York and was an active member of the student radio station URY.

Career 
Rollo has appeared on a large number of music projects, both within groups and solo, using various monikers, including Faithless (which he formed in 1995 with Sister Bliss, Jamie Catto and Maxi Jazz), Rollo Goes ..., Our Tribe (with Rob Dougan), and Dusted.

In late 1991, Rollo founded Cheeky Records, releasing two singles before the label folded. In 1992 Champion Records stepped in to help with funding and advice, and the label was restarted, with Reverence by Faithless its first album release (it has since been bought out by BMG). In 1992, Rollo co-wrote and co-produced Felix's hit single "Don't You Want Me", which reached number 1 in Finland, Italy, Spain and Switzerland, as well as reaching number 6 on the UK Singles Chart.

In the United States, Rollo is known for his production work on Dido's albums as well as singer-songwriter Kristine W's debut album, Land of the Living.

Rollo composed the official melody of the UEFA Euro 2008 and UEFA Euro 2012. He was nominated for an Academy Award in the category of Best Original Song for his work with A.R. Rahman and Dido on "If I Rise", featuring in the 2010 Danny Boyle film 127 Hours.

R+

In October 2019, Rollo released his first solo album, The Last Summer under the alias "R+", known as "R Plus" where format restrictions exist. It charted at No. 96 on the UK Album Sales Chart and at No. 55 on the UK Album Download Chart.

In July 2021, Rollo (as the alias R Plus) released "Hey Lover" which featured singer Amelia Fox. The pair had previously collaborated on a cover of Joy Division's 1980 hit "Love Will Tear Us Apart" which Rollo released in May 2021. On 13 May 2022, Rollo released WeDisappear, a collaboration album with Amelia Fox and Faithless.

Remix career 
In 1995 he teamed up with Rob D (Rob Dougan). From 1996 to 1998 he teamed up with Sister Bliss.

Discography

Albums 
2000 When We Were Young, as Dusted (with Mark Bates)
2005 Safe From Harm (re-release of When We Were Young), as Dusted (with Mark Bates)
2005 Instrumentals, as Dusted (with Mark Bates)
2019 The Last Summer, as R Plus (with Dido and Sister Bliss) (charted at No. 96 on the UK Album Sales Chart in October 2019)
2022 WeDisappear, as R Plus (with Faithless and Amelia Fox)

Singles 
Dusted
all produced with Mark Bates
1997 "Deeper River" (with Pauline Taylor)
2000 "Always Remember To Respect And Honour Your Mother"
2000 "Childhood/Want You"
2001 "Under The Sun"

Rollo & Rob D productions
all produced with Rob Dougan
1993 "I Believe In You", as Our Tribe (with Colette)
1994 "Love Come Home", as Our Tribe (with Frankie Pharaoh and Kristine W)
1994 "High", as O.T. Tunes
1994 "Hold That Sucker Down", as The O.T. Quartet (with Colette)
1995 "Hold That Sucker Down '95", as The O.T. Quartet (with Colette)
1995 "High As A Kite", as One Tribe (with Roger)
1995 "What Hope Have I", as Sphynx (with Sabrina Johnston)
2000 "Hold That Sucker Down 2000", as The O.T. Quartet (with Colette)
2005 "Hold That Sucker Down 2005", as The O.T. Quartet (with Colette)
2007 "What Hope Have I (Remixes)", as Sphynx (with Sabrina Johnston)

Rollo Goes...
1993 "Get Off Your High Horse", as Rollo Goes Camping (with Sister Bliss and Colette) – UK No. 43
1995 "Love, Love, Here I Come", as Rollo Goes Mystic (with Sister Bliss and Pauline Taylor) – UK No. 32
1996 "Let This Be A Prayer", as Rollo Goes Spiritual (with Sister Bliss and Pauline Taylor)- UK No. 26
1997 "Love, Love, Here I Come '97", as Rollo Goes Mystic (with Sister Bliss and Pauline Taylor)

Other aliases
1992 "Hypnotized", as High On Love (with Chris Rushby)
1992 "A Million Ways", as Stoned Democracy (with Chris Rushby)
1993 "In My World", as High On Love (with Chris Rushby)
1993 "Close (Like An Overdose)", as Stoned Democracy (with Chris Rushby)
1994 "Give Me Life", as Mr. V (with Rob Villiers)
1996 "Help Me Make It", as Huff & Puff (with Ben Langmaid and Sister Bliss)
2000 "Born Again", as Huff & Puff (with Ben Langmaid)

R Plus
2019 "My Boy" (featuring Dido)
2021 "Hey Lover" (featuring Amelia Fox)

Single production for other artists
1992 Felix – "Don't You Want Me" (with Red Jerry)
1992 Felix – "It Will Make Me Crazy"
1992 Frankë – "Understand This Groove" (with Rob Dougan)
1993 Frankë – "We're On A Mission"
1993 U.S.U.R.A. – "Tear It Up"
1994 Sister Bliss – "Cantgetaman, Cantgetajob (Life's A Bitch!)" (with Colette)
1994 Kristine W – "Feel What You Want" (with Rob Dougan)
1995 Kristine W – "One More Try" (with Rob Dougan)
1995 Kristine W – "Don't Wanna Think" (with Rob Dougan)
1995 Sister Bliss – "Oh! What A World" (with Colette)
1995 Sunscreem – "Exodus" (Tuff Mix)
1996 Kristine W – "Land Of The Living" (with Rob Dougan)
1996 Sister Bliss – "Bad Man" (with Junkdog Howler)
1996 Pauline Taylor – "Constantly Waiting" (with Sister Bliss and Matt Benbrook)
1998 Pauline Taylor – "The Letter" (with Matt Benbrook)
2000 Shawn Christopher – "So Wrong" (with Rob Dougan)
2000 Sister Bliss feat. John Martyn – "Deliver Me"
2000 Sister Bliss – "Sister Sister"
2001 Dido – "Thank You"
2003 Dido – "White Flag"
2003 Dido – "Life For Rent"
2004 Dido – "Don't Leave Home"
2004 Dido – "Sand In My Shoes"
2007 Kristine W – "Sweet Mercy Me" (with Rob Dougan)
2008 Dido – "Don't Believe In Love"
2009 Dido – "Quiet Times"
2013 Dido – "No Freedom"
2013 Dido – "End Of Night"
2019 Dido – "Take You Home"
2019 Dido – "Just Because"

Album production for other artists
1996 Kristine W – Land of the Living (with Rob Dougan)
1998 Pauline Taylor – Pauline Taylor
1999 Pet Shop Boys – Nightlife
2000 Dido – No Angel
2003 Dido – Life For Rent
2003 P*Nut – Sweet As
2005 Enigma – The Dusted Variations
2008 Dido – Safe Trip Home
2013 Dido – Girl Who Got Away
2019 Shey Baba – Requiem
2019 Dido – Still on my Mind

References

External links 
Official Website
Faithless at eNotes.
UEFA EURO 2008 full Trailer Intro Theme Jingle on YouTube. This is the long version of the trailer with the full soundtrack, composed by Rollo.

1966 births
Living people
Alumni of the University of York
British trance musicians
Dido (singer)
English electronic musicians
English dance musicians
English house musicians
English record producers
English techno musicians
English people of Irish descent
Ivor Novello Award winners
Musicians from London
People from Kensington
Remixers